Enoch Araujo Sánchez (born 26 March 1949) is a Mexican politician from the National Action Party. From 2000 to 2003 he served as Deputy of the LVIII Legislature of the Mexican Congress representing Chiapas. He was also municipal president of Tuxtla Gutiérrez from 1995 to 1998.

See also 
 List of municipal presidents of Tuxtla Gutiérrez

References

1949 births
Living people
People from Tuxtla Gutiérrez
Politicians from Chiapas
National Action Party (Mexico) politicians
21st-century Mexican politicians
20th-century Mexican politicians
Municipal presidents in Chiapas
Deputies of the LVIII Legislature of Mexico
Members of the Chamber of Deputies (Mexico) for Chiapas